Andrey Podlazov (born 6 June 1968) is a Russian archer. He competed in the men's individual and team events at the 1996 Summer Olympics.

References

1968 births
Living people
Russian male archers
Olympic archers of Russia
Archers at the 1996 Summer Olympics
Place of birth missing (living people)